William Heveningham (1604–1678) was an English politician who sat in the House of Commons  from 1640 to 1653. He supported the Parliamentary cause in the English Civil War and was one of the Regicides of Charles I of England.

Political life
The son of Sir John Heveningham, he was High Sheriff of Norfolk in 1633. In April 1640, he was elected Member of Parliament for Stockbridge in the Short Parliament. He was re-elected MP for Stockbridge for the Long Parliament in November 1640 and sat until 1653 in the Rump Parliament. He served on committee of Eastern Association in  1646.

A member of high court he refused to sign the death-warrant of Charles I in 1649.  He was a member of council of state in 1649 and was appointed  Vice-Admiral of the Coast for Suffolk in 1651.

At the Restoration Heveningham's life was saved by the exertions of his wife's relations in 1661. He was imprisoned at Windsor in 1664.

Family life
Heveningham married firstly Katherine Walop, d. 1648, daughter of Sir Henry Wallop. They had three children: 
 Elizabeth Heveningham, b. 1639 in Heveningham, Suffolk, England
 John Heveningham, b. 1641 in Heveningham, Suffolk, England
 Bridget Heveningham, b. 1642 in Heveningham, Suffolk, England

In 1655, Heveningham married Mary Carey, 1631–1696, daughter of John Carey, 2nd Earl of Dover. They had two children: 
 William Heveningham, d. 1675, married Barbara Villiers, daughter of George Villiers, 4th Viscount Grandison
 Abigail Heveningham, 1660–1686, married Sir John Newton, 3rd Baronet of Barrs Court.  They were the maternal grandparents of Thomas Coke, 1st Earl of Leicester of Holkham Hall

See also
List of regicides of Charles I

Notes

References
Attribution

 

1604 births
1678 deaths
Regicides of Charles I
High Sheriffs of Norfolk
English MPs 1640 (April)
English MPs 1640–1648
English MPs 1648–1653
English politicians convicted of crimes
People from Suffolk Coastal (district)